Gesgapegiag is one of two First Nations reserves on the south shore of the Gaspésie, most of whom are of Mi'kmaq ancestry.  Most of the members reside on the federal Indian reserve that was set aside by the legislature of Lower Canada in 1853, for the exclusive use of the majority of Mi'kmaq in this region.  The remaining Mi'kmaq live off-reserve in the eastern United States and across Canada, but stay connected to the community through modern communications and travel to. All community members, regardless of residence, participate in democratic elections held every two years to elect one Chief and eight Councillors in accordance with Canada's Indian Act Election Regulations.  The community is also allied to other Mi'kmaq communities in the Gaspé region of Quebec and in northern New Brunswick.  Together, their elected Chiefs advance ancestral claims to self-government and to the traditional territory called Gespe'gewa'gi ('Kespékewáki), the last land.

Gespe'gewa'gi is the Mi'kmaq Nation District that extends from the Miramichi River to the tip of the Gaspé Peninsula, a land area that straddles the modern day Quebec/New Brunswick border. The First Nation is a strong advocate of Aboriginal peoples in Canada, and aboriginal and treaty rights. Its main resource is the Atlantic salmon and other fruits of the waters and forests, including modern harvest of timber. Political representatives of the Mi'kmaq of Gesgapegiag and the greater district of Gespe'gewa'gi continue talks with the Government of Quebec over access to traditional lands.

The name Gesgapegiag, is the origin for the name of the Cascapédia River, as well as other nearby places carrying the name Cascapedia.

Gallery

Notes

External links
 http://www.mikmaqonline.org/

Gaspé Peninsula
Mi'kmaq in Canada